Live on I-5 is a live album by the American rock band Soundgarden. It was recorded during the West Coast leg of their 1996 tour, and released on March 22, 2011. They announced the album, the band's first live album, on their website on January 13, 2011.
The title is a reference to Interstate 5, which runs along the Pacific coast of the United States. The band hired Adam Kasper to record several shows with a rented 24-track machine/truck. They planned to release the live album after the tour, but they disbanded and the tapes were left in Studio X (then Bad Animals Studio). A live version of "Blow Up the Outside World" was released as a 256 bit MP3 download to those who pre-ordered Live on I-5 from Soundgarden's official website.

Track listing 
All songs by Chris Cornell unless noted.

Notes
Tracks 1–3, 5, 8–9, 15 and 18 recorded on November 30, 1996 at Del Mar Fairgrounds in Del Mar, California
Tracks 4, 10, and 14 recorded on December 18, 1996 at Mercer Arena in Seattle, Washington
Track 6 recorded on December 7, 1996 at Pacific National Exhibition Forum in Vancouver, British Columbia
Track 7 recorded on December 8, 1996 at Salem Armory in Salem, Oregon
Tracks 11–13, 17 recorded on December 5, 1996 at Henry J. Kaiser Convention Center in Oakland, California
Track 16 recorded on December 17, 1996 at Mercer Arena in Seattle, Washington

Pre–order bonus CD:
Tracks 1–3 recorded on December 5, 1996 at the Henry J. Kaiser Convention Center in Oakland, California
Track 4 recorded on December 7, 1996 at the Pacific National Exhibition Forum in Vancouver, British Columbia
Track 5 recorded on December 4, 1996 at the Memorial Audiotorium in Sacramento, California

Best Buy bonus DVD:
Tracks 1–3 recorded on August 8, 2010 at the Lollapalooza Festival in Chicago, Illinois

Chart performance

Personnel 
Soundgarden
Matt Cameron – drums
Chris Cornell – lead vocals, rhythm guitar
Ben Shepherd – bass, backing vocals
Kim Thayil – lead guitar

References 

A&M Records live albums
Soundgarden live albums
2011 live albums
Albums produced by Adam Kasper
Soundgarden video albums
2011 video albums
A&M Records video albums
Live video albums
Live grunge albums